Ağbaşlar (also, Agbashlar) is a village and municipality in the Tovuz Rayon of Azerbaijan.  It has a population of 951.  The municipality consists of the villages of Ağbaşlar, Almalıtala, and Lazılar.

References 

Populated places in Tovuz District